USS Pioneer may refer to:

 , a nineteenth-century barque.
 USS Pioneer (1862), may refer to a scuttled Confederate States Navy submarine raised by Union troops or may refer to the Bayou St. John submarine which was for decades misidentified as the Pioneer.
 , a World War II minesweeper commissioned in 1942 and sold to Mexico in 1973 as Leandro Valle
 , is an  currently in service.

See also 
 , the name of more than one ship of the United States Coast and Geodetic Survey.

United States Navy ship names